The red dress effect is a phenomenon in which a woman wearing red clothing, such as a red dress, is perceived to be more sexually appealing than she is when wearing other colours.

In primates, a visual indicator of female fertility occurs by way of swelling during the follicular phase and is correlated with increased estrogen levels. It has been asserted that this effect acts subconsciously because participants rarely report that they used color in their attractiveness judgments. However, only one study has  tested whether conscious awareness matters, with its findings casting doubt on this earlier speculation.

Hypothesis

Evolution
A plant's entomophilous flowers make a display when fertile to attract pollinating insects, bats, birds or other animals. In the wild, when many species of non-human primate females become fertile, their estrogen level rises, which causes their blood vessels to open up, leading to redness on the skin, especially near the face, chest and genitalia. The color display on some female primates is called sexual swelling. This increase in redness has been shown to attract male counterparts, expressed by their increased activity in sex, self-stimulation, and attention towards the females. Therefore, there are reasons to believe in the existence of evolutionary instincts that associate red with fertility, assuming the animal in question can perceive colour with its eyes.

Social conditioning
Folklore, mythology and literature associate red with fertility, and women are thought to have worn the equivalent of a red lipstick as early as 10,000 B.C. and so sexual receptiveness and red may be a result of social conditioning. However, this social conditioning may have originated for biological and evolutionary reasons, and is simply an extension of our primal instincts. 

The human genitals, such as the vulva, normally have hair that would hide any coloured skin underneath.

Evidence for and against
In a study by Pazda it was shown that females wearing red are rated more attractive by males. They explained this by referring to the biological aspect that sexually receptive women are more attractive because of them having a higher probability for engaging in sexual activity, as well as a higher probability for the males to successfully reproduce.

The same effect seems to work the other way round. In a disputed study by Elliot it was shown that males wearing red are rated more attractive by females.

A large replication study by Peperkoorn et al. found no evidence for the red dress effect. Indeed, another large experiment found no evidence that red color cues are systematically associated with attractiveness ratings, casting doubt on the underlying mechanisms typically used to explain the red dress effect.

See also
 Green-beard effect
 Lipstick
 Peafowl
 Ribbon-tailed astrapia
Female cosmetic coalitions

References

Psychological effects